Valeri Vladimirovich Tumaykin (born 6 January 1968; died 13 September 1994) was a Russian professional footballer.

Club career
Tumaykin made his professional debut in the Soviet Second League for FC Krylia Sovetov Kuybyshev on 25 April 1986. He helped Krylia Sovetov finish second in the Second League during the 1991 season, winning promotion to the Soviet Top League for the following season. He played three seasons in the Top League, appearing in 62 league matches before his death in 1994.

Death
Tumaykin had accumulated significant personal debts and committed suicide at age 26 on 13 September 1994 by jumping out of the apartment window.

References

External links

1968 births
Sportspeople from Samara, Russia
Suicides by jumping in Russia
1994 deaths
Soviet footballers
Russian footballers
Association football defenders
Russian Premier League players
PFC Krylia Sovetov Samara players
1994 suicides